Nagarvala Day School is a school that is located in Kalyani Nagar, Pune, India. The School was established by the Late Principal N. D. Nagarvala and the Late Dr (Mrs.) Erin N. Nagarvala in the year 1947. The school is governed by a Board of Governors who forms a part of The National Education Society.

This school is known for its strict haircut rules for boys. The school is affiliated to Maharashtra SSC Board and the school is located in a very small area surrounded by housing societies and IT firms. They also have a separate boarding school which is very spacious and is located to the north of the day school. The boarding school is compounded over 3 acres. The day school has only a small playground. The school was previously known as National Model School. The principal of the day school is S. Balsavar (Since 2013). The school has excelled in all fields with alumni of the school flourishing in fields, like sports, speech and drama and politics.

See also 
List of schools in Pune

External links 

Boarding schools in Maharashtra
Schools in Pune